Gregory Island may refer to:

Gregory Island (Antarctica) 
Gregory Island (Western Australia)
Gregory Island (Houtman Abrolhos) 
Gregory Island (Kimberley coast)